Peipsidrilus is a genus of annelids belonging to the family Naididae.

Species:
 Peipsidrilus pusillus
 Peipsidrilus saamicus

References

Annelids